Johann Stangl was an Austrian luger who competed during the 1950s. He won the bronze medal in the men's singles event at the 1955 European luge championships in Hahnenklee, West Germany.

References

External links
List of European luge champions 

Austrian male lugers
Possibly living people
Year of birth missing